Kanako Hirai (平井香菜子 Hirai Kanako, born April 15, 1984) is a Japanese volleyball player who played for Hisamitsu Springs.

On October 1, 2014, Hisamitsu Springs announced her retirement.

Career

Award

Individuals
 2014 Asian Club Championship - Best Middle Blocker

Clubs
Mie Prefectural Tsushogyo High School → Tsukuba Univ. → Hisamitsu Springs (2007-)
 2014 Asian Club Championship -  Champion, with Hisamitsu Springs.

National team
The 5th AVC Eastern Zonal Volleyball championships(2006)
 Universiade national team (2007)
 2013 Asian Championship -  Silver medal

References

External links
JVA biography
Hisamitsu Springs Official Site

Japanese women's volleyball players
1984 births
Living people